Anne Imhof (born 1978 in Giessen, Germany) is a German visual artist, choreographer, and performance artist who lives and works between Frankfurt and Paris. She is best known for her endurance art, although she cites painting as central to her practice. Her signature style is to write her name onto the work of other artisans to spread her brand.

Life 
Imhof was born in Giessen to a wealthy family and grew up in Fulda. She received private drawing lessons from a teacher at a boarding school in England.  She moved to Frankfurt, living in a commune and making music in her twenties. She worked as a bouncer for a club called Robert Johnson. She graduated from the Städelschule in Frankfurt in 2012.

Professional career

Solo shows

2012
 Audition Opelvillen, Rüsselsheim

2013
 SOTSB njjy, New Jersey, Basel
 Parade, Portikus, Frankfurt

2014
 Carré d'Art, Musée d'art contemporain, Projectroom, Nîmes
 Rage II, Liste Performance Program, Basel
 Rage I, Deborah Schamoni, Munich

2015
 DEAL, MoMA PS1, New York

2016
 Angst, Kunsthalle Basel, Basel, Switzerland
 Angst II, Hamburger Bahnhof, Berlin
 Angst III, Biennale de Montréal, Montréal
 Overture, Galerie Buchholz, Cologne

2017
 FAUST, German Pavilion, 57th Venice Biennale, Venice

2019
 Sex, Tate Modern, London 
 Sex, Art Institute Chicago, Chicago

2020
Sex, Castello di Rivoli, Turin

2021
 Natures Mortes, Palais de Tokyo, Paris
 Sex, X-room, National Gallery of Denmark (SMK), Copenhagen

2022
 YOUTH, Stedelijk Museum, Amsterdam
 Avatar II, Sprüth Magers, London

2023
 Sprüth Magers, Los Angeles (forthcoming)

Group shows

2011
 Andrei Koschmieder puts, Real Fine Arts, New York
 Birth of the Worm, The Leland Hotel Ballroom, Detroit
 Open Studios, Villa Romana, Florence

2012
 Beautiful Balance, CAPC, Musée d'Art Contemporarin, Bordeaux
 Beautiful Balance, Neue Alte Brücke, Frankfurt
 Beautiful Balance, Kunsthalle Bern, Bern
 Zauderberg, Graduation show, MMK Frankfurt

2013
 Soapy, Neue alte Brücke, Frankfurt
 Gemini, curated by Jeanne Graff, Galerie Francesca Pia, Zurich
 Freak out, Greene Naftali Gallery, New York
 Mike / Restlessness in the Barn, curated by Oona von Maydell, with Cosima von Bonin, Jana Euler, Lucie
 Stahl, Nassauischer Kunstverein, Wiesbaden
 Coded Conduct, Pilar Corrias, London

2014
 Present Future, curated by Jamie Stevens, Artissima, Torino
 Boom she Boom, Works of the collection, MMK, Frankfurt, Germany
 Tes Yeux, curated by Anne Dressen, 186f Kepler, Paris
 The Mechanical Garden, curated by Naomi Pearce, CGP London, London
 Trust, curated by Michele D'Aurizio, Fluxia Gallery, Milan
 Liste Performance Program, curated by Fabian Schöneich, Basel
 Abandon the Parents, SMK Statens Museum for Kunst, National Gallery of Denmark, Copenhagen
 Die Marmory Show, Deborah Schamoni, Munich
 Pleasure Principles, Lafayette Foundation, Paris

2015
 Preis der Nationalgalerie, Hamburger Bahnhof, Berlin
 Works on Paper, William Arnold, Brooklyn
 IN MY ABSENCE, curated by Dorothea Jendrike, Galerie Jocelyn Wolff, Paris, France
 Our Lacustrine Cities, curated by Laura Mc Lean Ferris, Chapter NY, New York
 Angelic Sisters, Kepler 186, with John Armleder, Genesis P.Orridge, Stefan Tcherepnin, Milan
 Do Disturb, Palais de Tokyo
 Nouveau Festival, Centre Pompidou, Paris
 Life Gallery, curated by Marlie Mul, Vilma Gold, London
 New Frankfurt Internationals, Frankfurter Kunstverein, Frankfurt
 New Frankfurt Internationals, Nassauischer Kunstverein, Wiesbaden

Venice Biennale
In 2017 Anne Imhof represented Germany at the Venice Biennale, transforming the pavilion with her performance piece, 'Faust' The performers arranged themselves throughout the pavilion, above and below the installed glass floors.  Sometimes crawling under the floors, other times engaging in activities which range from looking sulky and checking their mobile phones, to masturbation and lighting small fires. 
Imhof was rewarded the prestigious Golden Lion award for "Best National Participation", in a much written about effort. This award is given to only one of the 85 exhibitions mounted in pavilions in the Giardini della Biennale and across Venice

Awards 
 2017: Absolut Art Award
 2017: Golden Lion for best national contribution at the Biennale di Venezia
 2015: Award of the National Gallery
 2013: Studio Scholarship in Paris from Hessische Kulturstiftung
 2012: Graduate Award of the Städelschule Portikus e. V.
 2012: ZAC (zonta art contemporary)
2020: BEN Award "Most Important Artist" in the category Gesamtkunstwerk at the B3 Biennial of the Moving Image
 2022: Binding-Kulturpreis 2022

Notes

References

Further reading
"Imhof, Fierce Young Artist and Choreographer Wins Venice's Top Prize" from The New York Times

1978 births
Städelschule alumni
German choreographers
German performance artists
German contemporary artists
Living people